Baccharis  is a genus of perennials and shrubs in the aster family (Asteraceae). They are commonly known as baccharises but sometimes referred to as "brooms", because many members have small thin leaves resembling the true brooms. They are not at all related to these however, but belong to an entirely different lineage of eudicots. B. halimifolia is commonly known as "groundsel bush", however true groundsels are found in the genus Senecio.

Baccharis, with over 500 species, is the largest genus in the Asteraceae.
It is found throughout the Americas, distributed mainly in the warmer regions of Brazil, Argentina, Colombia, Chile and Mexico, with B. halimifolia ranging northward along the Atlantic Coast to the southern tip of Nova Scotia in Canada.

If present, the leaves of Baccharis are borne along the stems in alternate fashion. Flowers are usually white or pinkish. There are no ray flowers, but many disk flowers which are either staminate or pistillate.

Some species of Baccharis are toxic to animals; in particular, consumption of B. coridifolia may lead to necrosis in the gastrointestinal tract of cattle, horses, sheep, and rabbits.

The genus Baccharis is named after Bacchus (Dionysus), the Roman god of wine.

Classification
Baccharis is related to the genera Archibaccharis and Heterothalamus.
All baccharis are dioecious except Baccharis monoica.

Ecology
Baccharis are used as food plants by the larvae of some Lepidoptera species, such as the swift moths Phymatopus californicus and P. hectoides. Those of the leaf-miner moths Bucculatrix dominatrix and B. seperabilis feed exclusively on bush baccharis (B. pilularis), B. ivella has been found on eastern baccharis, and B. variabilis is a  polyphagous species which has been recorded on various Baccharis. The Coleophora case-bearers C. linosyridella and C. viscidiflorella are polyphagous species whose larvae have been recorded on the Bush Baccharis as well as other plants. Caterpillars of the owlet moth Schinia ocularis feed exclusively on Broom Baccharis (B. sarothroides).

Uses
Several species of Baccharis are of interest for cultivation, as the dense but flexible stem structure makes for a good windbreak.

Plants of this genus are rich in terpenes, and some are used in native or folk medicine. One that has been specifically described from Chilean and Argentinean Baccharis is viscidone.

Baccharis flowers are rich in nectar, and several species are good honey plants. Particularly B. dracunculifolia is highly esteemed by beekeepers.

Conservation
A few Baccharis species (especially from the northern Andes) are almost extinct due to habitat destruction.  The northernmost occurrence of B. halimifolia, in Nova Scotia, Canada, is also receiving conservation attention.

Invasiveness
Some Baccharis species, particularly Eastern baccharis (B. halimifolia), have become invasive weeds in places such as Australia and Spain, where they are not native.

Selected species

For the complete list of species see List of Baccharis species.

 Baccharis acutata (Alain) Borhidi
 Baccharis alaternoides Kunth
 Baccharis albida Hook. & Arn.
 Baccharis × alboffii F.H.Hellw.
 Baccharis albolanosa A.S.Oliveira & Deble
 Baccharis aliena (Spreng.) Joch.Müll.
 Baccharis alleluia A.S.Oliveira & Deble
 Baccharis alnifolia Meyen & Walp.
 Baccharis alpestris Gardner
 Baccharis alpina Kunth
 Baccharis altimontana G.Heiden, Baumgratz & R.Esteves
 Baccharis amambayensis Zardini & Soria
 Baccharis anabelae (Deble) G.Heiden
 Baccharis angusticeps Dusén ex Malme
 Baccharis angustifolia Michaux
 Baccharis anomala DC.
 Baccharis antioquensis Killip & Cuatrec.
 Baccharis × antucensis F.H.Hellw.
 Baccharis aphylla DC.
 Baccharis apicifoliosa A.A.Schneid. & Boldrini
 Baccharis aracatubensis Malag. & Hatschb. ex G.M.Barroso
 Baccharis arbutifolia(Lam.) Vahl
 Baccharis × arcuata F.H.Hellw.
 Baccharis arenaria Baker
 Baccharis aretioides Turcz.
 Baccharis artemisioides Hook. & Arn.
 Baccharis articulata (Lam.) Pers.
 Baccharis auriculigera Hieron.
 Baccharis × australis F.H.Hellw.
 Baccharis axillaris DC.
 Baccharis ayacuchensis Cuatrec.
 Baccharis barragensis Cuatrec.
 Baccharis beckii Joch.Müll.
 Baccharis bicolor (Joch.Müll.) G.Heiden
 Baccharis bifrons Baker
 Baccharis bigelovii A.Gray
 Baccharis bogotensis Kunth
 Baccharis boliviensis (Wedd.) Cabrera
 Baccharis boyacensis Cuatrec.
 Baccharis brachylaenoides DC.
 Baccharis brachyphylla A.Gray
 Baccharis brachystachys (Baker) Malag. & J.Vidal
 Baccharis brevifolia DC.
 Baccharis brevipappa (McVaugh) G.L.Nesom
 Baccharis breviseta DC.
 Baccharis buchtienii H.Rob.
 Baccharis burchellii Baker
 Baccharis buxifolia Pers.
 Baccharis cabrerae Ariza
 Baccharis caespitosa (Ruiz & Pav.) Pers.
 Baccharis concava (Ruiz & Pav.) Pers.
 Baccharis dioica
 Baccharis douglasii DC. – Saltmarsh baccharis, Douglas' baccharis
 Baccharis dracunculifolia DC.
 Baccharis eggersii Hieron.
 Baccharis emoryi A.Gray
 Baccharis fusca Turcz.
 Baccharis genistelloides Pers.
 Baccharis glomeruliflora
 Baccharis glutinosa  
 Baccharis gracilis DC.
 Baccharis halimifolia L. – Eastern baccharis, groundsel bush, groundsel tree, consumption weed, cotton-seed tree, silverling
 Baccharis hambatensis Kunth
 Baccharis havardii
 Baccharis hieronymi Heering
 Baccharis huairacajensis Hieron.
 Baccharis humilis Sch.Bip. ex Baker
 Baccharis intermedia DC.
 Baccharis intermixta Gardner
 Baccharis juncea (Lehm.) Desf.
 Baccharis klattii Benoist
 Baccharis ligustrina DC.
 Baccharis linearis (Ruiz & Pav.) Pers. – Chilean romerillo
 Baccharis macraei Hook. & Arn.
 Baccharis malibuensis R.M.Beauch. & J.Henrickson
 Baccharis microdonta DC.
 Baccharis myrsinites
 Baccharis neglecta
 Baccharis odorata – Tayanka bush
 Baccharis patagonica
 Baccharis pilularis DC. – Bush baccharis, coyote brush, coyote bush, chaparral broom
 Baccharis platypoda DC.
 Baccharis plummerae A.Gray
 Baccharis pteronioides
 Baccharis punctulata DC.
 Baccharis racemosa (Ruiz & Pav.) DC.
 Baccharis rhomboidalis Remy
 Baccharis sagittalis
 Baccharis salicifolia (Ruiz & Pav.) Pers. – Mulefat, seep-willow, water-wally
 Baccharis salicina
 Baccharis sarothroides  A.Gray – Broom baccharis, Desert broom
 Baccharis semiserrata DC.
 Baccharis sergiloides A.Gray – Desert baccharis
 Baccharis serrula Sch.Bip.
 Baccharis sessifolia L.
 Baccharis sphaerocephala
 Baccharis spicata (Lam.) Baill.
 Baccharis texana 
 Baccharis thesioides
 Baccharis tricuneata (L.f.) Pers.
 Baccharis tridentata Vahl
 Baccharis trimera (Less.) DC.
 Baccharis uncinella DC.
 Baccharis vanessae R.M.Beauch.
 Baccharis wrightii  – Wright's false willow
 Baccharis wurdackeana Malag.
 Baccharis xiphophylla Baker 
 Baccharis zamoranensis Rzed.
 Baccharis zamudiorum Rzed.
 Baccharis zoellneri F.H.Hellw.
 Baccharis zongoensis Joch.Müll.
 Baccharis zumbadorensis V.M.Badillo

Formerly placed in Baccharis
The following species are among the many that were considered to belong within Baccharis but are now classified in other genera:
 Isocoma veneta (Kunth) Greene (as B. veneta Kunth)
 Pluchea foetida (L.) DC. (as B. foetida L.)
 Pluchea indica (L.) Less. (as B. indica L.)
 Ozothamnus hookeri Sond. (as B. lepidophylla DC.)
 Vernonanthura brasiliana (L.) H.Rob. (as B. brasiliana L.)
 Vernonanthura montevidensis (Spreng.) H.Rob. (as B. montevidensis Spreng.)

References

Bibliography

External links
 Pictures of Baccharis rhomboidalis, Baccharis sagittalis and Baccharis sphaerocephala growing in Chile.
 
 
 

 
Asteraceae genera
Dioecious plants